Parafield Airport  is on the edge of the residential suburb of Parafield, South Australia,  north of the Adelaide city centre and adjacent to the Mawson Lakes campus of the University of South Australia. It is Adelaide's second airport and the third busiest airport in Australia by aircraft movements. Although owned by the Government of Australia, the airport is leased to and managed independently by Parafield Airport Ltd., a wholly owned subsidiary of Adelaide Airport Limited.

Parafield was Adelaide's only civil airport until Adelaide Airport was opened in February 1955 and is currently used for small aircraft, pilot training and recreational aviation. The airport is home to the University of South Australia Aviation Academy. The airport hosts a jet fighter museum and historic aircraft displays. The museum now houses an authentic flight worthy Wirraway.

There are also multiple flight training schools including the University of South Australia Aviation Academy, FTA (Flight Training Adelaide) formerly known as Australian Aviation College, Bruce Hartwig Flying School, AFTC (Adelaide Flight Training Centre), Aerostar Aviation, and Parafield Flying Centre. Parafield Squadron of the Australian Air League, a national uniformed cadet organisation promoting and encouraging the interest of aviation and flying training in the youth of Australia, is also located at Parafield Airport.

History 
The first powered flight in South Australia was of a Blériot Aéronautique monoplane in 1910, south-west of Salisbury. In the 1920s investigations began into construction of an airport in Adelaide. Land was initially purchased in Albert Park with the aerodrome site becoming the new suburb of Hendon; but within a few years the cost of acquiring sufficient land, neighbouring residential development and the erection of power transmission lines all interfered with airport plans and the Hendon site was effectively abandoned. In 1927, the Commonwealth government purchased  of land at Parafield from a family owned farming company for £17,000. The area had been used for fattening sheep on lucerne and other fodder plants. The new airport was expanded in 1942, with the boundary extending west to the Gawler railway line.

On 1 October 1927, H. C. "Horrie" Miller was the first to land on the Parafield site, ground preparation was completed on the 17th and flights began on 26 November by the Aero Club of South Australia. The site was officially opened as an airport in August 1929 by Governor-General of Australia Alexander Hore-Ruthven. The control tower opened shortly prior to World War II. Prior to the war Guinea Airways was the main company flying out of the airport using:
 de Havilland Fox Moth – DH83
 de Havilland Dragon Rapide – DH89
 Lockheed Electra Model 10A
 Lockheed Model 14 Super Electra
 Messerschmidt Taifun
 Douglas DC-3
 Lockheed 18 Lodestar
 Ford Trimotor 5-A

During World War II, the Royal Australian Air Force (RAAF) occupied the airfield as a station for basic flight training and was home to No. 1 Elementary Flying Training School (No. 1 EFTS) between 1939 and 1944 until it moved to Tamworth, New South Wales. A relief landing ground was located near Virginia. No. 34 Squadron utilised Parafield to deliver supplies to operational bases and aerodromes in the Northern Territory and Western Australia between 1943 and February 1945.

In addition, No. 238 Squadron RAF was based at Parafield from June to December 1945, from where it flew Dakota aircraft in support of the British Pacific Fleet as part of No. 300 Group RAF.

After the war ended, transport was also handled by Australian National Airways and Trans Australia Airlines both moving to Adelaide Airport in 1955 which now handles all regular passenger transport.

In 1983 a group of trees was planted by local high school students. When fully grown, from the air they clearly spelt out the word "PARAFIELD". As of 2007 the trees had been removed.

The Parafield Airport Air Traffic Control Tower is listed on the Australian Commonwealth Heritage List.

Classic Jets Fighter Museum
Parafield airport houses the Classic Jets Fighter Museum. Founded in the 1980s, the collection includes a Lockheed P-38 Lightning and a Bell P-39 Airacobra.

Classic Jets Airshow accident
On 17 March 2013, a Supermarine Aircraft Spitfire Mk26, an 80% scale home-build replica of the Supermarine Spitfire, crashed into a fence between two businesses in a commercial area on Frost Road in the nearby suburb of Salisbury, whilst completing a routine at the airshow, killing the pilot.

Triumph in the Skies

Hong Kong TVB filmed flight training scenes for their series Triumph in the Skies at the Parafield Airport.

Noise pollution 
The airport has been criticised by local residents for contributing to noise pollution, particularly after the opening of a flight school and the resulting increase in planes flying traffic patterns.

Accidents and Incidents
 In 2018, a Cessna 172 crashed into a paddock next to Parafield Airport. The plane took off but it started to have problems immediately and the pilot caused the plane to crash. There were no deaths or injuries.

See also 
 List of airports in South Australia
 Transport in Australia

References

External links 

Airliners.Net pictures at Parafield Airport
Classic Jets Fighter Museum
Parafield – RAAF Museum

Airports in South Australia
Transport in Adelaide
Airports established in 1927
Aerospace museums in Australia
Military and war museums in Australia